Kees Tijman (12 June 1897 – 28 September 1954) was a Dutch weightlifter. He competed in the men's featherweight event at the 1920 Summer Olympics.

References

External links
 

1897 births
1954 deaths
Dutch male weightlifters
Olympic weightlifters of the Netherlands
Weightlifters at the 1920 Summer Olympics
Sportspeople from Amsterdam
20th-century Dutch people